Şevketibostan yemeği (Turkish: Şevketibostan yemeği) is a dish cokked and consumed in Aegean region of Turkiye. Ingredients include Şevketibostan (Cnicus benedictus), lamb chunks, onion, juice of half a lemon, flour, butter, and salt.

See also

 Colocasia with lamb
 Corn poppy with lamb

References

Turkish cuisine